Alley Cat is a 1984 American action film directed by Victor M. Ordonez, Eduardo Palmos, and Al Valletta (all under the alias Edward Victor) and starring Karin Mani and Robert Torti. Mani stars as a young female martial arts expert who becomes a one-woman vigilante against a local street gang.

Cast
 Karin Mani as Billie
 Robert Torti as Johnny
 Michael Wayne as Scarface
 Jon Greene as Boyle
 Jay Fisher as Charles Clark
 Claudia Decea as Rose
 Tim Cutt as Thomas Vernon
 Jay Walker as Judge Taylor
 Moriah Shannon as Sam
 Marla Stone as Karen Stride
 Tony Oliver as Bob Mertel

Reception
DVD Talk gave it 3 out of 5.

References

External links
 
 

1984 films
1984 action films
1984 martial arts films
American action films
American martial arts films
Films shot in Los Angeles
American vigilante films
1980s vigilante films
1980s English-language films
1980s American films